The Spyker Squadron was the factory racing team from Dutch sportscar manufacturer Spyker Cars. The team raced in various endurance championships and non-championship races from 2002 to 2010. Daily operations were managed by Peter van Erp, the later Spyker Cars COO.

History

Spyker C8 Double-12R

Reiter Engineering developed the Spyker C8 Double-12R to compete in the 2002 24 Hours of Le Mans GT class. The team debuted the car at the 2002 12 Hours of Sebring with Derek Hill, Peter Kox and Hans Hugenholtz. The team retired after four hours due to accident damage. At the 24 Hours of Le Mans the team retired over halfway through the race. A valve problem in the BMW engine caused the retirement.

The C8 Double-12R was again raced in 2003. Engine trouble again hampered their 12 Hours of Sebring effort. The team retired just past the half way mark. Sponsored by telecom provider Orange S.A. the team presented drivers Tom Coronel, Hans Hugenholtz and Norman Simon. Gearbox trouble prevented a strong finish, the team finished the race but was not classified as it was to far behind. The team also entered the lone race of the 2003 Le Mans Series, the 1000km of Le Mans. Norman Simon, joined by Belgian Patrick van der Schoote, finished the race in 25th place overall.

Spyker C8 Spyder GT2-R
In 2004 the team focused on developing a new variant on the C8, the C8 Spyder GT2-R. The car debuted at the 2005 24 Hours of Le Mans. The Audi powered car failed to finish the race due to an engine fire almost seven hours into the race. The team returned at the 1000km of Nürburgring, the fourth round of the 2005 Le Mans Series season. Drivers Jeroen Bleekemolen and Donny Crevels finished eighteenth overall, second in the GT2 class. The team finished in the same lap as the class winning Porsche 996 GT3. Near the end of the year the team made its debut in the FIA GT Championship. Racing at Zhuhai and Dubai the team scored two top five class finishes. At Dubai the team finished third in class.

For 2006 the Spyder was fitted with a roof. The team entered the full 2006 Le Mans Series. The team's best result was a sixteenth place overall, third in class, at the 1000km of Jarama. Both Spykers entered the 2006 24 Hours of Le Mans, but both did not finish. In the 2006 Spa 24 Hours the team fought for a fourth place in class most of the race, before having to settle for tenth.

The team scaled down to a single car for the 2007 season. In the Le Mans Series, drivers Mike Hezemans and Peter Dumbreck scored a third place in class finish at the 1000km of Silverstone. At the 24 Hours of Le Mans the team did not finish the race. An engine problem seven hours into the race stopped the car at Tetre Rouge.

In 2008 the car won its final race, the 1000 kilometrų lenktynės with Jonas Gelžinis, Ralf Kelleners, Peter Dumbreck and Alexey Vasilyev.

Spyker C8 Laviolette GT2-R

Introducing the C8 Laviolette GT2-R in 2008 the team did not finish the 24 Hours of Le Mans. Three fourth-place finishes in the 2008 Le Mans Series placed the team third in the constructors championship. Despite the main company moving to Coventry, the racing team remained in Zeewolde. The team repeated its performance feat in 2009. The team even scored to second in class finishes at the 1000km of Nürburgring and the 1000km of Silverstone. At the 24 Hours of Le Mans the team finished the race. Drivers Tom Coronel, Jeroen Bleekemolen and Jaroslav Janiš finished the Snoras sponsored car in fifth place in class. Snoras became a major stakeholder in the Spyker Cars company.

In 2010 the team again entered the Le Mans Series as well as the 24 Hours of Le Mans. The team again finished the prestigious sports car race, as the last classified car. The team finished in 27th place, 117 laps behind the overall winning car.

Spyker C8 Aileron GTE
In 2011 the team took a sabbatical to develop the C8 Aileron to race in 2012. But as the major shareholder Snoras filed for bankruptcy and a deal with its owner Vladimir Antonov fell through, the team folded.

24 Hours of Le Mans results

Gallery

References

Dutch auto racing teams
FIA GT Championship teams
24 Hours of Le Mans teams
European Le Mans Series teams
American Le Mans Series teams
Dutch racecar constructors
Auto racing teams established in 2001
Auto racing teams disestablished in 2011